Riópar is a municipality in Albacete, Castile-La Mancha, Spain. It has a population of 1,498.

References

See also
Church of Espíritu Santo

Municipalities of the Province of Albacete